Battle Angel Alita, known in Japan as , is a manga series created by Yukito Kishiro in 1990 and originally published in Shueisha's Business Jump magazine.

The series is set in the post-apocalyptic future and focuses on Alita, a cyborg who has lost all memories and is found in a garbage heap by a cybernetics doctor who rebuilds and takes care of her. She discovers that there is one thing she remembers, the legendary cyborg martial art Panzer Kunst, which empowers her to become a Hunter Warrior, or bounty hunter. The story documents Alita's attempts to rediscover her past, as well as the characters whose lives she impacts on her journey. The series is continued in Battle Angel Alita: Last Order and Battle Angel Alita: Mars Chronicle.

Volume list

Battle Angel Alita

Japanese volume list

English-language volume list

Battle Angel Alita: Holy Night & Other Stories

Battle Angel Alita: Last Order

Omnibus volume list

Battle Angel Alita: Mars Chronicle

References

External links

Battle Angel Alita
Battle Angel